Chavs: The Demonization of the Working Class is a non-fiction work by the British writer and political commentator Owen Jones, first published in 2011. It discusses stereotypes of sections of the British working class (and the working class as a whole) and use of the pejorative term chav. The book received attention in domestic and international media, including selection by critic Dwight Garner of The New York Times as one of his top 10 non-fiction books of 2011 in the paper's Holiday Gift Guide and being long-listed for the Guardian First Book Award.

The book explores the political and economic context for the alienation of working-class Britain. It references the impact of British government policy from the Thatcher era onwards and how it has been used as a political weapon to disenfranchise the working class, dismantle societal structures designed to support the working class – such as unions – and pit working class communities against each other.

It was published in Dutch in 2013, translated by Charles Braam.

References

2011 non-fiction books
Books about media bias
Books about politics of the United Kingdom
Books by Owen Jones
Class discrimination
Political books
Working-class culture in the United Kingdom
Verso Books books